Tiangu or Tian Gu or variation, may refer to:

 Tiangu (天孤, Tiān-gū), one of the 108 Stars of Destiny
 Tiangu property rights in Traditional Chinese law
  (程·天固), Mayor of Guangzhou and then Ministry of Economic Affairs (Taiwan)

See also

 Gu (disambiguation)
 Tian (disambiguation)
 Gutian (disambiguation)